Peeping Times is a 1978 American comedy television special that aired on NBC on January 25, 1978. Co-produced, written and directed by Rudy De Luca and Barry Levinson, the special featured an early broadcast network appearance of David Letterman. David Frost was co-executive producer. The show was a spoof of TV news magazine programs.

Cast
Alan Oppenheimer as Miles Rathbourne
David Letterman as Dan Cochran
Lee Delano as Seedy Man
Ron Carey as Angelo Bertinelli
Murphy Dunne as Dr. Burnett
Michael Fairman as Mayor of Ewell
Mel Brooks as Adolf Hitler
James Cromwell as Bernard Mantee

References

External links

1978 television specials
NBC television specials
Films directed by Barry Levinson
Films scored by Joe Raposo